Abu Kamal District is a district of the Deir ez-Zor Governorate in northeastern Syria. The administrative centre is the city of Abu Kamal. At the 2004 census, the district had a population of 265,142.

The Euphrates divides the district, with Hajin and As-Souseh subdistricts being part of Jazira (Upper Mesopotamia) while Abu Kamal and Al-Jalaa subdistricts are part of the Shamiyah (the Syrian Desert). Abu Kamal is an economically prosperous farming region with cattle-breeding, cereals, and cotton crops. It is home to the historical site Dura-Europos and the tell of the ancient kingdom of Mari.

Subdistricts 
The district of Abu Kamal is divided into four subdistricts or nawāḥī (population as of 2004):
Abu Kamal Subdistrict (ناحية البوكمال): population 92,031.
Hajin Subdistrict (ناحية هجين): population 97,870.
Al-Jalaa Subdistrict (ناحية الجلاء): population 29,255.
Al-Susah Subdistrict (ناحية السوسة): population 45,986.

References 

 
Districts of Deir ez-Zor Governorate